William Duval may refer to:
 William Pope Duval, first governor of Florida Territory
SS William P. Duval, a Liberty ship
William Duval (ice hockey) (born 1877), hockey player

See also
William DuVall, singer, guitarist and songwriter